Terrel Ray Castle (born September 12, 1972) is an American former professional basketball player. He played college basketball at Nicholls State University and averaged 18.3 points per game during the 1995–96 season.

Career notes
He played college basketball at Southwestern Community College and at Nicholls State University. He played for KK Sloboda Tuzla from 1998 to 2001. He played for Maccabi Raanana in 2001 and then moved to JL Bourg-en-Bresse where he played during the 2001–02 season.

He played for Strasbourg IG in 2002 and then moved to EWE Baskets Oldenburg where he played from 2002 to 2004. He signed with Aris Thessaloniki in 2004, and played there until 2008. With Aris BC he played in the Greek Basketball Cup final against Panathinaikos BC in 2005 and also in the ULEB Cup final against MBC Dynamo Moscow in 2006.

In 2008, he left Aris and joined CB Málaga and later that same year he joined Olympia Larissas BC. In 2009, he joined Iraklis Thessaloniki B.C. in Greek League 2nd-tier division (A2).

Castle played for the Bosnia and Herzegovina national basketball team at the FIBA EuroBasket 2003.

Euroleague career highs
Offensive Rebounds 4 Basket Napoli vs. Aris Thessaloniki 11/8/2006

Defensive Rebounds 8 Aris Thessaloniki vs. Benetton Basket Treviso 1/18/2007

Total Rebounds 8 Aris Thessaloniki vs. Benetton Basket Treviso 1/18/2007

Steals 6 Basket Napoli vs. Aris Thessaloniki 11/8/2006

Blocks 1 Aris Thessaloniki vs. FC Barcelona  1/31/2007

References

External links
Euroleague.net Profile

1972 births
Living people
American expatriate basketball people in Bosnia and Herzegovina
American expatriate basketball people in France
American expatriate basketball people in Germany
American expatriate basketball people in Greece
American expatriate basketball people in Israel
American expatriate basketball people in Spain
American expatriate basketball people in Sweden
American expatriate basketball people in North Macedonia
American men's basketball players
AEK B.C. players
Aris B.C. players
Basketball players from Louisiana
Baloncesto Málaga players
EWE Baskets Oldenburg players
Greek Basket League players
Iraklis Thessaloniki B.C. players
Israeli Basketball Premier League players
KK Igokea players
KK Sloboda Tuzla players
Liga ACB players
Maccabi Ra'anana players
Makedonikos B.C. players
Nicholls Colonels men's basketball players
Olympia Larissa B.C. players
People from Jeanerette, Louisiana
Point guards
SIG Basket players
Southwestern Jaguars men's basketball players